Trewennan is a hamlet near St Teath, Cornwall, England, United Kingdom.

References

Hamlets in Cornwall